The 1983 Boston Red Sox season was the 83rd season in the franchise's Major League Baseball history. The Red Sox finished sixth in the American League East with a record of 78 wins and 84 losses, 20 games behind the Baltimore Orioles, who went on to win the 1983 World Series. It was the Red Sox' first losing season since 1966.

On June 6, general partner Buddy LeRoux attempted to replace general manager Haywood Sullivan with former general manager Dick O'Connell, leading to protracted legal proceedings between LeRoux and the team's other two general partners, Sullivan and Jean Yawkey. LeRoux ultimately lost in court the following June.

Offseason 
 November 1, 1982: Tony Pérez was released by the Red Sox.
 December 6, 1982: Carney Lansford‚ Garry Hancock‚ and a minor leaguer (Jerry King) were traded by the Red Sox to the Oakland Athletics for Tony Armas and Jeff Newman.
 January 10, 1983: Josías Manzanillo was signed as an amateur free agent by the Red Sox.
 January 11, 1983: Ellis Burks was drafted by the Red Sox in the 1st round of the January portion of the 1983 Major League Baseball draft. Burks signed on May 17.
 January 13, 1983: Mike Torrez was traded by the Red Sox to the New York Mets for a player to be named later. The Mets completed the deal by sending Mike Davis (minors) to the Red Sox on February 15.
 March 25, 1983: Brian Kingman was released by the Red Sox.

Regular season

Highlights 
Jim Rice led the American League in home runs (39) and total bases (344), and tied for the lead in RBIs (126) while hitting for a .305 batting average.
Wade Boggs led American League hitters with a .361 average and a .444 on-base percentage, finishing second in hits (210) and doubles (44).
Tony Armas may not have had enough hits to keep his average up (.218), but finished second in the league with 36 home runs and seventh with 107 RBI.
Carl Yastrzemski retired after 23 seasons, all with the Red Sox, one of the longest careers with one franchise in MLB history.

Season standings

Record vs. opponents

Notable transactions 
 June 6, 1983: In the 1983 Major League Baseball draft, the Red Sox drafted Roger Clemens in the 1st round (19th pick) and John Mitchell in the 7th round.

Opening Day lineup 
 
Source:

Roster

Statistical leaders 

Source:

Batting 

Source:

Pitching 

Source:

Awards and honors 
Awards
 Wade Boggs – Silver Slugger Award (3B)
 Dwight Evans – Gold Glove Award (OF)
 Jim Rice – Silver Slugger Award (OF)
Accomplishments
 Jim Rice, American League Leader Home Runs (39)
 Jim Rice, American League Leader RBIs (126)
All-Star Game
 Jim Rice, starting LF
 Bob Stanley, reserve P
 Carl Yastrzemski, reserve DH

Farm system 

The New Britain Red Sox replaced the Bristol Red Sox as a Double-A affiliate.

LEAGUE CHAMPIONS: New Britain

Source:

References

External links 
1983 Boston Red Sox team at Baseball-Reference
1983 Boston Red Sox season at baseball-almanac.com

Boston Red Sox seasons
Boston Red Sox
Boston Red Sox
Red Sox